Thunder Valley is the sixteenth novel in World of Adventure series by Gary Paulsen. It was published on December 1, 1997, by Random House.

Plot
The story is about Jeremy and Jason Parsons who are left to take care of their grandparents Thunder Valley Ski Lodge while their grandma goes to visit their grandfather in hospital with a broken hip. Strange things begin happening once Grandma leaves, though.

Novels by Gary Paulsen
1997 American novels
American young adult novels